HNLMS Schiedam (M845) is the twelfth ship in the City / Vlissingen-class mine countermeasures vessels, and sixth to be built for the Royal Netherlands Navy.

See also
 Future of the Royal Netherlands Navy

References

Minehunters of the Netherlands